The Tortoise and the Hare is a 1994 bronze sculpture by Nancy Schön, installed in Boston's Copley Square, in the U.S. state of Massachusetts. The work references one of Aesop's Fables, The Tortoise and the Hare, and commemorates Boston Marathon participants.

See also

 1994 in art
 Rabbits and hares in art

References

1994 establishments in Massachusetts
1994 sculptures
Animal sculptures in Massachusetts
Boston Marathon
Bronze sculptures in Massachusetts
Outdoor sculptures in Boston
Rabbits and hares in art
Sculptures of turtles
The Tortoise and the Hare
Works based on Aesop's Fables